Bernard Akoi-Jackson (born 1979) is a Ghanaian academic, artist and writer. He is known for projects that are in continual metamorphosis. His art works are mostly performative or pseudo-rituals. His writings are focused on the development of contemporary African, Ghanaian visual arts and culture in poetic and jovial manner. He is known as a proverbial jester or Esu using critical absurdity to move between installations, dance and poetry, video, and photography. He blends post-colonial African identities through transient and makeshift memorials.

Early life and education 
Akoi-Jackson attended Presbyterian Boys' Secondary School, for his secondary school education. He holds a Bachelor of Fine Arts, Master of Fine Arts and PhD in Painting and Sculpture from the College of Art and Built Environment, Kwame Nkrumah University of Science and Technology.

Career 
In August 2006, he had his first residency at Kofi Setordj's ArtHAUS where he developed his project '' REDTAPEONBOTTLENECK '' as a participatory performance. He had residencies with Stedelijk Museum as "Global-Artist -in-Residency between 2013 and 2014 and at the Thiami Mnyele Artists' Residency in Amsterdam. He is a lecturer at the College of Art and Built Environment, Kwame Nkrumah University of Science and Technology.

Exhibitions 
Material Effects: Contemporary Art from West Africa and the diaspora at Eli and Edythe Broad Art Museum at Michigan State University
Spaghetti Harvest, Project 88 Mumbai, India
Lilith Performance studio Malmo, Sweden
SCCA – the Savannah Centre for Contemporary Art, Tamale (Ghana)
SaNsA in Accra (2007)
SaNsA in Kumasi (2009)
Xerem International Artists’ Residency Home & Abroad in Portugal (2010)
Moderator of Architecture of Independence in Kumasi (2018)

See also 

 Ibrahim Mahama (artist)

References

External links 
 Bernard Akoi-Jackson at Coriolis Effect, Khoj, 2015
 Lilith Performance - Bernard Akoi Jackson - Untitled: How to Usher [an] African fully into [his]tory

1979 births
Living people
Artist authors
Place of birth missing (living people)
Ghanaian artists
Ghanaian writers
Kwame Nkrumah University of Science and Technology alumni
Academic staff of Kwame Nkrumah University of Science and Technology
Presbyterian Boys' Senior High School alumni